The 2015 Marburg Open was a professional tennis tournament played on clay courts. It was the sixth edition of the tournament which was part of the 2015 ATP Challenger Tour. It took place in Marburg, Germany between 29 June and 5 July 2015.

Singles main-draw entrants

Seeds

 1 Rankings are as of June 22, 2015.

Other entrants
The following players received wildcards into the singles main draw:
  Daniel Brands
  Jan Choinski
  Julian Lenz
  Daniel Masur

The following players gained entry into the Main Draw as a special exempt:
  Rogério Dutra Silva

The following players used protected ranking to gain entry into the Main Draw:
  Pere Riba

The following players received entry from the qualifying draw:
  Arthur De Greef
  Evgeny Donskoy
  Mikhail Ledovskikh
  Jan Šátral

The following players gained entry into the Main Draw as a lucky loser:
  Lorenzo Giustino

Doubles main-draw entrants

Seeds

1 Rankings as of June 22, 2015.

Other entrants
The following pairs received wildcards into the doubles main draw:
  Jan Beusch /  Lazar Magdinčev
  Jan Choinski /  Jannis Kahlke
  Yannick Hanfmann /  Julian Lenz

Champions

Singles

  Iñigo Cervantes def.  Nils Langer 2–6, 7–6(7–3), 6–3

Doubles

  Wesley Koolhof /  Matwé Middelkoop def.  Tobias Kamke /  Simon Stadler 6–1, 7–5

External links
Official Website 

Marburg Open
Marburg Open
2015 in German tennis